Daniel George Coogan (February 16, 1875 – October 28, 1942) was an American baseball player and coach. After graduating from the University of Pennsylvania, he played professionally for 11 seasons, including one in Major League Baseball with the Washington Senators. He also coached several college teams during and after his playing career.

Early life
Coogan was born in Philadelphia, Pennsylvania, in 1875. His parents, John and Emma Coogan, died when he was young.

Coogan attended Girard College and played for the school's baseball team until he graduated in 1892. He then attended the University of Pennsylvania and was the baseball team's catcher from 1892 to 1894. During this time, he acquired the nickname "Little Danny Coogan" due to his small stature.

Professional career
In 1895, Coogan graduated from the University of Pennsylvania and started his professional baseball career with the National League's Washington Senators. He played 26 games for the Senators, mostly as a shortstop, and batted .221 with seven runs batted in. Coogan then played in the minor leagues from 1896 to 1906. He had stints with several teams in the Eastern League and the New York State League.

Coogan coached the University of Pennsylvania's baseball team from 1904 to 1906. He coached at Cornell University from 1906 to 1913. He later coached at Bowdoin College and Georgetown University. During World War I, he was a physical director with the Canadian Army.

Coogan died in Philadelphia in 1942 and was buried in Holy Cross Cemetery.

References

External links

 

1875 births
1942 deaths
19th-century baseball players
Major League Baseball shortstops
Washington Senators (1891–1899) players
Bowdoin Polar Bears baseball coaches
Cornell Big Red baseball coaches
Georgetown Hoyas baseball coaches
Lehigh Mountain Hawks baseball coaches
Penn Quakers baseball coaches
Springfield Ponies players
Providence Grays (minor league) players
Providence Clamdiggers (baseball) players
New Bedford Whalers (baseball) players
Worcester (minor league baseball) players
Rochester Bronchos players
Rome Romans players
Binghamton Bingos players
Cortland Wagonmakers players
Reading Coal Heavers players
Utica Pentups players
Louisville Colonels (minor league) players
Utica Pent-Ups players
Schenectady Electricians players
Schenectady Frog Alleys players
Scranton Miners players
Nashville Vols players
Wilkes-Barre Barons (baseball) players
Baseball players from Philadelphia